Ecquedecques is a commune in the Pas-de-Calais department in the Hauts-de-France region of France.

Geography
The A26 autoroute passes by just a few yards from the commune.

Population

Places of interest
 The church of St.Omer, dating from the fifteenth century.

See also
Communes of the Pas-de-Calais department

References

Communes of Pas-de-Calais